Allen E. Paulson Stadium is a 25,000-seat on-campus football stadium in Statesboro, Georgia. It is home to the Georgia Southern Eagles football team and the focal point of Erk Russell Athletic Park.

Paulson Stadium was dedicated on September 29, 1984 with a 48–11 win over Liberty University. The game was a fitting end to four years of planning one of the finest I-AA facilities in America. The phrase "Prettiest Little Stadium in America" was coined by former Coach Erk Russell.  The stadium has also come to be known as "Our House" to reflect the extreme home field advantage (Overall record of 193-41 and home playoff record of 33-3).

History
The stadium is named for the late Allen E. Paulson, founder and owner of Gulfstream Aerospace, who donated more than $1 million toward construction of the facility. The late State Senator Glenn Bryant of Hinesville donated over $250,000 for the property. To recognize his gift, the playing surface of the stadium is named "Glenn Bryant Field".

The first game in Paulson was originally scheduled for September 1, 1984, against the Florida A&M Rattlers, but construction delayed by wet weather forced this game to be played in Savannah. The first touchdown scored was a 36-yard run around the right side by quarterback Tracy Ham against Liberty Baptist on September 29, 1984.

Features
26 climate-controlled private boxes, along with separate Eagle Club and President's Luxury Sky Suites, plus a 50-seat pressbox and film deck overlook the playing surface on the south side of the stadium. Prior to the start of the 2005 season, a brick façade was built along the walls of Paulson Stadium while the video scoreboard was also surrounded with a brick garden/façade. Built in 2006, the Gene Bishop Fieldhouse sits in the western open end of the natural bowl, replacing the Lupton Building, the stadium's original fieldhouse. The field level of the Bishop Fieldhouse includes team and officials dressing rooms, while the second-level houses a hospitality room and club-level seating. In the summer of 2007, the south concourse was improved with red brick walls on the concession stands and a paver sidewalk, and the stadium's parking area was also updated. The north concourse received similar renovations during the spring semester of 2008. Also following the death of legendary coach Erk Russell, a bust was added along the fence near the Gene Bishop Fieldhouse.

From the stadium's opening in 1984 until the end of the 2015 season, Paulson Stadium used a natural grass surface. On February 5, 2016, the university's athletic department announced that an artificial surface supplied by Shaw Sports Turf of Calhoun would be installed for the 2016 season.

Expansion
The stadium was scheduled to undergo a massive construction and expansion project beginning in the offseason of 2012. However, the start of the project was delayed until the 2013 offseason. This expansion project increased Paulson Stadium's total capacity to 25,000 and moved all of Georgia Southern's football facilities to a state-of-the-art Football Operations Center onsite. At the time the plan was originally announced, the 57,000-square foot facility was intended to be first of class at the FCS level and rival many at the FBS level; at the time of completion, Georgia Southern was a transitional FBS member in the Sun Belt Conference. The Ted Smith Family Football Center consists of coaches' offices, team meeting rooms, locker rooms, rehabilitation rooms, weight room and the Georgia Southern Football Hall of Fame. The $10 million facility is the largest privately funded project in the history of Georgia Southern University. The northern mid-deck was completed in time for the Spring 2014 commencement ceremony while the Ted Smith Family Football Center was formally dedicated on August 16, 2014.

Attendance records

See also
 List of NCAA Division I FBS football stadiums

References

External links
 Allen E. Paulson Stadium
 Georgia Southern Eagles Sports Facilities

College football venues
Sports venues in Georgia (U.S. state)
Georgia Southern Eagles football
Buildings and structures in Bulloch County, Georgia
American football venues in Georgia (U.S. state)
1984 establishments in Georgia (U.S. state)